Federal Neuro-Psychiatric Hospital, Kaduna is a federal government of Nigeria speciality hospital located in Barnawa, Kaduna State, Nigeria. The Current CMD is Dr. Aishatu Yushau Armaya'u.

History 
Federal Neuro-Psychiatric Hospital, Kaduna was established in 1975. The hospital was formerly known as Psychiatric Hospital Kakuri.

References 

Hospitals in Nigeria